Angelika Brand (born 13 February 1976) is a German rower.

References 
 

1976 births
Living people
German female rowers
Place of birth missing (living people)
World Rowing Championships medalists for Germany
20th-century German women
21st-century German women